Charles, Duke of Calabria (1298 – 9 November 1328), was the son of King Robert of Naples and Yolanda of Aragon.

Charles was born in Naples in 1298, during the reign of his paternal grandfather, King Charles II, the second king of the Angevin dynasty that ruled Naples since 1266. Charles was the son of the King's third son Prince Robert and his consort Yolanda of Aragon. Little is known of his early life, so one can assume that he spent his early years at the court of his grandfather. In 1309, Charles' grandfather died and his father became King Robert the Wise. It was then that he became Duke of Calabria and was created Vicar-General of the Kingdom of Sicily (Naples). His father intended him to lead the force sent to aid Florence in 1315, but was constrained by time to send his uncle, Philip I of Taranto, instead. The Florentine-Neapolitan coalition was badly beaten at the ensuing Battle of Montecatini.

The victory of Castruccio Castracani at Altopascio in 1325 led the Florentines to elect Charles signore (lord) of the city for ten years in 1326. At the time, he was unsuccessfully attempting to seize Sicily from his first cousin Frederick III, and sent Walter VI of Brienne as his deputy until he could arrive, where Walter made a (misleadingly) favorable impression. While Charles' arrival checked Castruccio, he exacted onerous taxes from the Florentines, until he was recalled to Naples in December 1327 due to the advance of Emperor Louis IV into Italy. There he died in 1328. He left as heir his eldest surviving daughter, Joanna Ι; a posthumous daughter, Marie, was born in 1329.

Charles was buried in the church of Santa Chiara in Naples.

Marriages and issue

In 1316, he married Catherine of Habsburg (1295–1323), daughter of Albert I of Germany. Catherine died in 1323, ad Charles married Marie of Valois (1309–1332), daughter of Charles of Valois, later that same year. They had five children:
 Eloisa (b. January or February 1325 – d. 27 December 1325).
 Joanna Ι (b. Naples, March 1326 – d. castello di San Fele, 22 May 1382), Queen of Naples after succeeded her grandfather.
 Charles Martel (b. Florence, 13 April 1327 – d. Florence, 21 April 1327).
 Maria (b. posthumously, Naples, May 1329 – d. Naples, 20 May 1366), Countess of Alba.

Ancestry

External links

History of Florence, Niccolò Machiavelli

1298 births
1328 deaths
Nobility from Naples
House of Anjou-Naples
Dukes of Calabria
Sons of kings
Joanna I of Naples
Burials at the Basilica of Santa Chiara
Heirs apparent who never acceded